Coptothyris is a monotypic genus of brachiopods belonging to the family Terebrataliidae. The only species is Coptothyris grayi.

The species is found in Europe, Northern America, Japan.

References

Terebratulida
Brachiopod genera
Monotypic brachiopod genera